Shukhrat Mukhammadiev  (born 24 June 1989) is an Uzbekistani professional footballer who plays as a defender for Lokomotiv Tashkent.

External links

References

1991 births
Living people
Uzbekistani footballers
Uzbekistan international footballers
FC Nasaf players
People from Qashqadaryo Region
Association football defenders
2015 AFC Asian Cup players
PFC Lokomotiv Tashkent players